The Harby Baronetcy, of Aldenham in the County of Hertford, was a title in the Baronetage of England.  It was created on 17 July 1660 for Job Harby.  The title became extinct on the death of the second Baronet in 1674.

Harby baronets, of Aldenham (1660)
Sir Job Harby, 1st Baronet (–1663)
Sir Erasmus Harby, 2nd Baronet (1628–1674)

References

Extinct baronetcies in the Baronetage of England